Acisoma panorpoides, the Asian pintail, trumpet tail, or grizzled pintail, is a species of dragonfly in the family Libellulidae.

Distribution
It is widespread in Asia, from the Indian subcontinent to Japan, the Philippines and Indonesia.

Description
It is a small dragonfly with blue eyes. Its thorax is azure-blue marbled with black to form a beautiful pattern on the dorsum and the sides. Abdomen is azure-blue, marked with black. Segments 1 to 5 have sutures finely and ventral borders more broadly black. There is a dorsal stripe which broadens at the jugal sutures and apical borders of segments. There is a speckled stripe on sub-dorsum of segments 1 to 4. There is a large ventro-lateral spot on each of segments 3 to 5. Segments 6 and 7 are black with a large spot of blue on each side. Segments 8 to 10 are entirely black. Anal appendages are bluish-white. Female is similar to the male; but with greenish-yellow eyes, thorax and abdominal segments up to 5.

The characteristic shape of the abdomen will serve to distinguish this species from other Libellulidae.

Habitat
It is found in subtropical or tropical swampy or marshy habitats. It has a very weak and short flight and keeps close to the herbage and reeds in the heavily weeded ponds and lakes where it breeds.

References

External links

Libellulidae
Insects described in 1842
Taxa named by Jules Pierre Rambur
Taxonomy articles created by Polbot